Bocula diasticta is a moth of the family Erebidae first described by George Hampson in 1926. It is found in Borneo.

References

Rivulinae